Major-General David John St. Maur Tabor  (5 October 1922 – 18 May 2004) was a British Army officer.

Military career
Educated at Eton College and the Royal Military College, Sandhurst, Tabor was commissioned into the Royal Horse Guards in 1942 and saw action in North-West Europe during the Second World War. He became commanding officer of the Royal Horse Guards and in that role was deployed to Cyprus. He went on to be commander of the Berlin Infantry Brigade in 1967, British Military Attaché in Washington, D.C. in 1969 and a member of the directing staff at the Royal College of Defence Studies in 1971. After that he became British Defence Attaché in Paris in 1972 and then General Officer Commanding Eastern District in 1975 before retiring in 1977.

He was made Companion of the Order of the Bath (CB) in the 1977 New Year Honours List.

He married Pamela Roxane Nivison, daughter of John Nivison, 2nd Baron Glendyne, in 1955; they had two sons. After the death of his first wife, he married Marguerite Arkwright (née Verdon) in 1989. She died in 2020.

References

 

1922 births
2004 deaths
Military personnel from Leicestershire
People educated at Eton College
Graduates of the Royal Military College, Sandhurst
Companions of the Order of the Bath
Recipients of the Military Cross
British Army generals
Royal Horse Guards officers
People from Ashby-de-la-Zouch
British Army personnel of World War II
British military attachés